Over the Edge is an anthology of horror stories edited by American writer  August Derleth. It was released in 1964 by Arkham House in an edition of 2,520 copies.  The anthology was produced to mark the 25th anniversary of Arkham House.  None of the stories had been previously published.

Contents

Over the Edge contains the following tales:

 "Foreword", by August Derleth
 "The Crew of the Lancing", by William Hope Hodgson
 "The Last Meeting of Two Old Friends", by H. Russell Wakefield
 "The Shadow in the Attic", by H. P. Lovecraft and August Derleth
 "The Renegade", by John Metcalfe
 "Told in the Desert", by Clark Ashton Smith
 "When the Rains Came", by Frank Belknap Long
 "The Blue Flame of Vengeance", by Robert E. Howard & John Pocsik
 "Crabgrass", by Jesse Stuart
 "Kincaid's Car", by Carl Jacobi
 "The Patchwork Quilt", by August Derleth
 "The Black Gondolier", by Fritz Leiber
 "The Old Lady's Room", by J. Vernon Shea
 "The North Knoll", by Joseph Payne Brennan
 "The Huaco of Señor Perez", by Mary Elizabeth Counselman
 "Mr. Alucard", by David A. Johnstone
 "Casting the Stone", by John Pocsik
 "Aneanoshian", by Michael Bailey
 "The Stone on the Island", by J. Ramsey Campbell

Sources

1964 anthologies
Fantasy anthologies
Horror anthologies
Arkham House books